Events in the year 1856 in Belgium.

Incumbents
Monarch: Leopold I
Head of government: Pierre de Decker

Events

 1 May – Railway line between Brussels and Ghent completed
 26 May – Provincial elections
 10 June – Partial legislative elections return a Catholic majority
 27 June – Royal order institutes a committee to examine Flemish language grievances.
 21-23 July – Celebration of the jubilee of Leopold I's swearing-in as monarch

Art and architecture
Paintings

 Charles de Groux, Pilgrimage of St Guido of Anderlecht
 Basile de Loose, The Happy Family
 Charles Leickert, Urban Landscape
 Henri Adolphe Schaep, Working in the Docks at Night
 Adolphe Stache, Elegant Company
 Charles-Philogène Tschaggeny, The Unwilling Traveller
 Antoine Wiertz, Coquette Dress (The Devil's Mirror)

Publications
Periodicals
 Almanach royal officiel (Brussels, Tarlier)
 Annales de pomologie belge et étrangère, vol. 4.
 Annuaire de la noblesse de Belgique, vol. 10, edited by Isidore de Stein d'Altenstein
 Annuaire statistique et historique belge, vol. 3, edited by Auguste Scheler
 Annuaire de l'Académie royale de Belgique, vol. 22
 La Belgique, 2
 La Belgique Horticole, vol. 6.
 Bulletin de la Société de médecine de Gand, vol. 23 (Ghent, Leonard Hebbelynck)
 Collection de précis historiques, vol. 5, edited by Edouard Terwecoren S.J.
 Journal de l'armée belge
 Journal d'horticulture pratique de la Belgique

Official reports and monographs
 Recueil consulaire contenant les rapports commerciaux
 Recueil des lois et arrêtés royaux de la Belgique, vol. 8
 Joseph Jean De Smet (ed.), Recueil des chroniques de Flandre, vol. 3 (Brussels, Commission royale d'Histoire)
 François Joseph Ferdinand Marchal and Edmond Marchal, Histoire politique du règne de l'empereur Charles-Quint (Brussels, H. Tarlier)
 Jean-Joseph Thonissen, La Belgique sous le règne de Léopold I, vol. 2 (Liège, J.-G. Lardinois)

Guidebooks and directories
 Bradshaw's Illustrated Hand-book for Travellers in Belgium, on the Rhine, and through Portions of Rhenish Prussia (London, W.J. Adams)

Births
 5 January – Omer Bodson, soldier (died 1891)
 15 January – Paul de Favereau, politician (died 1922)
 28 January – Eva Dell'Acqua, composer (died 1930)
 5 February – Thomas Louis Heylen, bishop (died 1941)
 6 February – Gerard Portielje, painter (died 1929)
 17 February – Joseph Boex, author (died 1940)
 11 April – Constant Lievens, Jesuit (died 1893)
 9 June – Auguste de Bavay, brewer (died 1944)
 12 June – Octave Maus, lawyer (died 1919)
 18 June – Edward Génicot, Jesuit (died 1900)
 26 July – Edward Anseele, politician (died 1938)
 1 August – Frans Hens, artist (died 1928)
 26 August – Léon Frédéric, painter (died 1940)
 9 October – Sylvain Dupuis, composer (died 1931)
 27 October – Albrecht Rodenbach, poet (died 1880)
 28 December – Henri de Merode-Westerloo, politician (died 1908)

Deaths
 7 March – Alphonse de Woelmont (born 1799), politician
 22 November – Albert Prisse (born 1788), diplomat
 28 December – Auguste Drapiez (born 1778), naturalist

References

 
Belgium
Years of the 19th century in Belgium
1850s in Belgium
Belgium